Squamicornia aequatoriella is a species of moth belonging to the family Micropterigidae. It was described by Kristensen & Nielsen in 1982. It is known from the Napo province in Ecuador.

References

Micropterigidae
Moths described in 1982
Taxa named by Ebbe Nielsen